Sisaye Feleke (born 15 January 1947) is an Ethiopian sprinter. He competed in the men's 4 × 100 metres relay at the 1972 Summer Olympics.

References

External links
 

1947 births
Living people
Athletes (track and field) at the 1972 Summer Olympics
Ethiopian male sprinters
Olympic athletes of Ethiopia
Place of birth missing (living people)
20th-century Ethiopian people
21st-century Ethiopian people